George Montagu publishes  Supplement to the Ornithological dictionary, or Synopsis of British birds
The Berlin museum contains 2000 bird specimens

Ongoing events
Coenraad Jacob Temminck:  Histoire naturelle générale des pigeons et des gallinacés. New species described in this work in 1813 include Madagascar turtle-dove, spot-winged pigeon, Picazuro pigeon, Picui ground-dove and grey junglefowl.
Alexander Wilson:  American Ornithology (1808–1814). Species described in this work in 1813 include the solitary sandpiper. Wilson died in this year. American Ornithology was completed by George Ord.

Birding and ornithology by year
1813 in science